The Bratislava Open is a professional tennis tournament played on clay courts.

The tournament is part of the ATP Challenger Tour. It is held in Bratislava, Slovakia, since 2019. The tournament replaced Poprad-Tatry ATP Challenger Tour.

Past finals

Singles

Doubles

References

2019 establishments in Slovenia
Recurring sporting events established in 2019
ATP Challenger Tour
Clay court tennis tournaments
Tennis tournaments in Slovakia
Sports competitions in Bratislava
Bratislava Open